The New Orleans mayoral election of 1958, held in February, resulted in the re-election of deLesseps Morrison to his fourth consecutive term as mayor of New Orleans.    Morrison was able to defeat the Regular Democratic Organization candidate - former State Representative Claude W. Duke - soundly, winning 90,802 of the 157,320 votes cast in the election compared to Duke's 43,231 votes.  State Representative Fred C. Donaldson ran a distant third with 18,999 votes; no runoff was required.   Morrison had proven able to consistently defeat the once powerful RDO machine, but since mayors were only allowed two consecutive terms under the new city charter of 1954, this would be Morrison's last term in office.

Sources 
 Haas, Edward F.  DeLesseps S. Morrison and the Image of Reform: New Orleans Politics, 1946-1961.  LSU Press, 1974.
 Parker, Joseph B.  The Morrison Era:  Reform Politics in New Orleans.  Pelican, 1974.

Mayoral elections in New Orleans
New Orleans
1958 Louisiana elections